Beavercreek Township is one of the twelve townships of Greene County, Ohio, United States. As of the 2010 census the township population was 52,156, up from 41,745 at the 2000 census. Of the 52,156 residents at the 2010 census, 5,762 lived in the unincorporated portions of the township.

Geography
Located in the western part of the county, it borders the following townships and cities:
Bath Township and Fairborn- north
Xenia Township and Xenia City - east
Spring Valley Township - southeast
Sugarcreek Township - south
Kettering - southwest
Riverside - northwest

Several populated places are located in Beavercreek Township:
Most of the city of Beavercreek, in the west
Part of the city of Fairborn, in the north
Part of the city of Xenia, in the southeast
Part of Wright-Patterson Air Force Base, a census-designated place, in the northwest
Trebein, an unincorporated community, in the southeast
Small unincorporated parts of New Germany, in the northwest

Name and history
Beavercreek Township was established in 1803 at a meeting in a log house on Beaver Creek.

It is the only Beavercreek Township statewide.

Government
The township is governed by a three-member board of trustees, who are elected in November of odd-numbered years to a four-year term beginning on the following January 1. Two are elected in the year after the presidential election and one is elected in the year before it. There is also an elected township fiscal officer, who serves a four-year term beginning on April 1 of the year after the election, which is held in November of the year before the presidential election. Vacancies in the fiscal office or on the board of trustees are filled by statutory process.

Education
Beavercreek Township is home to Ohio University Russ Research Center and Clark State's Greene Center and is in close proximity to Antioch College, Cedarville University, Central State University, University of Dayton, Wilberforce University, and Wright State University.

Beavercreek City School District consists of one middle school, part of the $84 million bond issue passed on November 4, 2008, to be used to build an elementary and middle school and renovate buildings district-wide.

References

External links
Beavercreek Township official website
County website

Townships in Greene County, Ohio
1803 establishments in Ohio
Townships in Ohio